Markus Mustajärvi (born 24 February 1963) is a Finnish politician for the Left Alliance. He has represented Lapland in the Parliament of Finland since 2003.

Life and career

Mustajärvi was born in Savukoski, Lapland. He graduated as ylioppilas in 1982, forestry engineer in 1988 and Master of Social Sciences in 1993, the last degree being from the University of Jyväskylä. He was member of the City Council of Kemijärvi until 2012 when he switched to Municipal Council of Savukoski.

On 30 June 2011 Mustajärvi and fellow MP Jyrki Yrttiaho were expelled from the parliamentary group of the Left Alliance because they had voted for a motion of no confidence against the Katainen Cabinet in which the Left Alliance was represented. Mustajärvi and Yrttiaho founded a new opposition parliamentary group called the Left Faction in September 2011. After the 2015 election Mustajärvi was allowed to return to the Left Alliance parliamentary group.

On 17 May 2022, Mustajärvi was one of 8 MPs who voted against Finland joining NATO following the Russian invasion of Ukraine stating an opposition to making Finland's border "the border between the military alliance and Russia."

References

External links
 

1963 births
Living people
People from Savukoski
Left Alliance (Finland) politicians
Members of the Parliament of Finland (2003–07)
Members of the Parliament of Finland (2007–11)
Members of the Parliament of Finland (2011–15)
Members of the Parliament of Finland (2015–19)
Members of the Parliament of Finland (2019–23)
University of Jyväskylä alumni